Glyphodes subcrameralis is a moth in the family Crambidae. It was described by Pagenstecher in 1900. It is found in Papua New Guinea.

References

Moths described in 1900
Glyphodes